Moon Kyung-ae (문 경애, born ) was a South Korean weightlifter, competing in the +75 kg category and representing South Korea at international competitions.

She participated at the 2000 Summer Olympics in the +75 kg event. She competed at world championships, most recently at the 2001 World Weightlifting Championships.

Major results

References

External links
 

1979 births
Living people
South Korean female weightlifters
Weightlifters at the 2000 Summer Olympics
Olympic weightlifters of South Korea
Place of birth missing (living people)
Weightlifters at the 1998 Asian Games
Weightlifters at the 2002 Asian Games
Asian Games medalists in weightlifting
Asian Games bronze medalists for South Korea
Medalists at the 2002 Asian Games
20th-century South Korean women
21st-century South Korean women